Wedderburn is a former railway station, serving the town of Wedderburn, Victoria, Australia. It was the only station on a short branch line from the Robinvale railway line, the junction itself being named Wedderburn Junction.

The passenger platform was shortened from 35.5m to 6m in 1976.

References

Disused railway stations in Victoria (Australia)